Mangalai was a 13th-century kingdom with its capital in northwest China's Akesu city. Mentioned by Marco Polo, it was subservient to Genghis Khan from 1224 to his death in 1227. On the edge of the Yuan dynasty, Mangalai was controlled by the Chagatai Khanate. Its latter history sees periods of autonomy or inclusion of one of many larger kingdoms including: Mogulistan, Kashgar, and Kingdom of Kashgaria. In 1877 the area came under the control of the Qing dynasty and remains part of the Chinese autonomous region of Xinjiang.

List of rulers

Early time and Mongol conquests

Babdagan allied with Genghis Khan and his Mongols (1224–1227) playing taxes to them and providing military assistance thus keeping his kingdom. With the death of Genghis, the area came within the Chagatai Khanate from 1227 to 1348.

1348-1514 A part of Mogulistan

External links
 Text and notes by N. Elias on the account of the Tarikh-i-Rashidi

History of Xinjiang
Former countries in Central Asia
Former countries in Chinese history